Patrice Louis René Higonnet (born 3 February 1938) is a French author, historian, and retired professor who currently serves as a Robert Walton Goelet Research Professor of French History at Harvard University. He previously taught European history.

Early life 
Higonnet was born in Saint Cloud, France. Higonnet parents were René Alphonse Higonnet and Thérèse Higonnet née David.

Personal life 
Higonnet's second wife, Ethel Higonnet, was raped and murdered in Longfellow Park in Cambridge, Massachusetts in 1973.

Higonnet subsequently married University of Connecticut professor Margaret Higonnet (née Cardwell) in 1976. He has three children.

References

External links

Harvard University faculty
1938 births
Living people
20th-century French historians
Harvard University alumni
20th-century French essayists
21st-century French essayists
20th-century French male writers
21st-century French male writers
21st-century French historians